La Plaza (Spanish for the square) is a Chilean village located in Pichilemu, Cardenal Caro Province.

Populated places in Pichilemu